Ladji Diakité (Arabic: لادجي دياكيتي), is a Malian filmmaker. He is best known as the director of critically acclaimed feature films such as Duel à Dafa and Fantan Fanga. Apart from direction, Diakité is also an assistant director and costume designer.

Personal life
He was born in Bamako, Mali. Diakité obtained his master’s degree in literature from the Ecole Normale Supérieure. He also studied at the Centre national du cinéma et de l'image animée (National Centre for Film Production).

Career
In 1991, he joined the film Ta Dona as the costume designer. Then in 1997, he worked in the film Taafé Fanga as the assistant director.

In 2001, he directed maiden film La Rencontre des chasseurs. In 2006, he involved in the tele film Duel a Dafa. Then in 2007, he directed Duel à Dafa and then Fantan Fanga co-directed with Adama Drabo in 2009. The film received official selection of Panafrican Film and Television Festival of Ouagadougou (FESPACO) 2009. Meanwhile, he became the head of Chief Production Division of the Centre national de la cinématographie du Mali (National Center of Cinematography of Mali: CNCM).

Filmography

References

External links
 

Living people
Documentary film directors
Malian film directors
People from Bamako
Year of birth missing (living people)
21st-century Malian people